The 2010 Mid-American Conference men's basketball tournament is the post-season basketball tournament for the Mid-American Conference (MAC) 2009–2010 season.  Ninth-seeded Ohio won the tournament received the MAC's automatic bid into the NCAA Men's Division I Basketball Championship tournament. There they defeated Georgetown 97–83 before losing to Tennessee in the second round. Armon Bassett of Ohio was named the tournament MVP.

Format
Each of the 12 men's basketball teams in the MAC receives a berth in the conference tournament.  Teams are seeded by conference record with the following tie-breakers:
 Head-to-head competition
 Winning percentage vs. ranked conference teams (top to bottom, regardless of division, vs. common opponents regardless of the number of times played)
 Coin flip

The top four seeds receive byes into the quarterfinals.  The winners of each division are awarded the #1 and #2 seeds.  The team with the best record of the two receives the #1 seed.  First round games will be played on campus sites at the higher seed.  The remaining rounds will be held at Quicken Loans Arena.

Bracket

* Overtime

Tiebreakers

All-tournament team

 Armon Bassett, Ohio (MVP)
 Jimmy Conyers, Akron
 David Kool, WMU
 Carlos Medlock, EMU
 Chris McKnight, Akron

References

Mid-American Conference men's basketball tournament
Tournament
MAC men's basketball tournament
MAC men's basketball tournament
Basketball in Cleveland